HDMS Friderichssteen or HMS Frederichsteen was a Danish Navy frigate, built in 1800, and captured by the  Royal Navy in 1807 at the Battle of Copenhagen. She was taken into service as HMS Fredericksteen (or Frederickstein) and served in the Mediterranean until being finally broken up in 1813.

Royal Danish Navy
Friderichssteen was a 32-gun frigate built to a design by F.C.H. Hohlenberg and launched in 1800. She had a small hull, and consequently lacked the storage capacity for long-endurance cruises to distant stations. She was laid up in 1801 and not fitted out until 1802.

At the end of March 1801 a British fleet arrived at St Thomas, in the Danish West Indies. The Danes accepted the Articles of Capitulation the British proposed and the British occupied the islands without a shot being fired. The British occupation lasted until April 1802, when the British returned the islands to Denmark.

1802–1803
Captain Carl Adolph Roth (1767–1834), sailed Frederikssteen to the Danish West Indies. There he also took his place on the Ruling Commission for the Danish West Indies for matters relating to the naval service. On her return voyage to Denmark in 1803, Frederikssteen carried the retiring Governor General, Major Walterstorff.

1803–1804
Captain Carl Wilhelm Jessen sailed Frederikssteen on her second voyage to the Danish West Indies. As with his predecessor, Part of his remit was to act for the government of the Danish West Indies on all questions of naval service and maritime defence.

1805–1806
During this period Frederikssteen served in home waters under two captains, each of whom died while in command. In 1805 Captain Rasmus Rafn (1764–1805), commanded Frederikssteen, which served in the Evolution (training) Squadron. His successor was Captain Michael Christopher Ulrich (1760–1806). The squadron, of ten vessels, was under the command of Rear-Admiral Otto Lutken, who raised his flag in Fredericksteen.

Royal Navy
After the 1807 Battle of Copenhagen, the Royal Navy took control of most of the Danish Fleet. Fredericksteen was sailed to Portsmouth, where she arrived on 19 November. She underwent fitting between 3 October and 27 February 1809.

She was commissioned under the command of Captain Joseph Nourse in December 1808, who took her on convoy escort to the Mediterranean in June 1809. Captain Thomas Searle replaced Nourse and returned her to the Mediterranean in November that year.

Nourse was in command in 1810 at Smyrna. In May, he wrote a letter explaining the circumstances surrounding  taking a schooner from the Ottomans. The taking had become a matter of some dispute between Great Britain and the Ottoman government and Nourse provided his justification. Eight days later Mr. Stratford Canning wrote to Nourse stating that the British Government supported him and his actions fully. Canning explained the problems that were bedeviling the relations between the two governments and suggested gently that in the future Nourse avoid confrontation with the authorities unless absolutely necessary. The English schooner that Nourse removed from Coron was Ann.

Francis Beaufort was promoted to post captain and was appointed to command  Fredericksteen in May 1810. However, his duties in the Mediterranean prevented him from taking up this post until December that year. Throughout 1811–1812, Beaufort charted and explored southern Anatolia, locating and recording many classical ruins.

In October 1811 Beaufort removed property from a "pirate boat", and on 3 December Frederickstein captured the polacca Teresina. An attack on the crew of his boat (at Ayas, near Adana), by Turks interrupted his work and on 20 June 1812 he received a near-fatal bullet wound in the hip.

Beaufort sailed her back to England as a convoy escort.

The ship shared in the proceeds from 's detention in September 1812 of the American droit Sally – Britain being at war with the US at the time. Lloyd's List (LL) reported that Sally,  a prize to Frederickstein, had arrived at Gibraltar on 18 September.

Fate
Fredericksteen was paid off in November 1812. She was offered for sale, lying at Woolwich, in April 1813, and was sold in June the same year.

Notes

Citations

References
 
 
 Feldborg, Andreas Andersen (1805) A Tour in Zealand, in the Year 1802: With an Historical Sketch of the Battle of Copenhagen. (C. & R. Baldwin).
 Nautical Magazine and Naval Chronicle... a Journal of Papers on Subjects Connected with Maritime Affairs (1858). (Simpkin, Marshall & Company).
T. A. Topsøe-Jensen og Emil Marquard (1935) “Officerer i den dansk-norske Søetat 1660-1814 og den danske Søetat 1814-1932“. Two volumes. Download Volume 1 and Volume 2

External links
 

1800 ships
Ships designed by Frantz Hohlenberg
Ships built in Copenhagen
Frigates of the Royal Dano-Norwegian Navy
Frigates of the Royal Danish Navy
Captured ships
Fifth-rate frigates of the Royal Navy